Lawrence Donald Bearnarth (September 11, 1941 – January 1, 2000) was a relief pitcher in Major League Baseball who played for the New York Mets (1963–66) and Milwaukee Brewers (1971).

Personal
Bearnarth was born in a Manhattan hospital but lived his childhood in Brooklyn and later on Staten Island.  He went to St. Peter's Boys High School on Staten Island and played varsity basketball and baseball. He then attended  St. John's University, and graduated with a degree in English literature. He died as result of a massive heart attack at the age of 58 on New Year's Eve 1999 at his home in Florida.

Playing career
In a five-season career, Bearnarth posted a 13–21 record with a 4.13 ERA and eight saves in 173 games pitched. He allowed 350 hits and 135 bases on balls in 322 innings pitched, with 124 strikeouts.

Bearnarth was signed by the New York Mets in 1962 and went directly to the Triple-A Syracuse Chiefs of the International League. A year later wearing #31, he started his big league career for the 1963 Mets, a team coming off an historic 40–120  record in its inaugural season as an expansion team. Despite his 3–8 record in his rookie year, Bearnarth maintained a 3.46 ERA in a career-high 126 innings pitched. During the next three seasons, he divided his playing time between the Mets and Triple-A Buffalo and Jacksonville.

From 1967 to 1970 Bearnarth pitched in Triple-A with the Jacksonville Suns (1967–68) and Tidewater Tides. In 1971 he was signed as a free agent by the Milwaukee Brewers and wore #29, retiring at the end of the season. 

He was able to obtain the required pension time as an active player (five years then). Then, following his playing career, he became a pitching coach.

Bearnarth became pitching coach for the Montreal Expos in 1976 wearing #48 and between 1985 and 1991 wearing #36. Under his guidance, the team's ERA never was higher than 3.92 (in 1986), including the best ERA in franchise history, at 3.08 (1988). Two years later, his staff led the National League with a 3.37 ERA (1990).  He was a minor league pitching instructor in the Montreal farm system between those terms.

In 1993 Bearnarth became the first pitching coach in Colorado Rockies history wearing #36, continuing in that post until 1995. After that, he scouted during four seasons for the Detroit Tigers (1996–99).

See also

Staten Island Sports Hall of Fame

References

External links

Larry Bearnarth - Baseball Biography and Highlights
Historic Baseball
Retrosheet
Venezuelan Professional Baseball League

1941 births
2000 deaths
Buffalo Bisons (minor league) players
Colorado Rockies (baseball) coaches
Colorado Rockies scouts
Detroit Tigers scouts
Evansville Triplets players
Florida Instructional League Mets players
Industriales de Valencia players
Jacksonville Suns players
Major League Baseball pitchers
Major League Baseball pitching coaches
Milwaukee Brewers players
Minor league baseball managers
Montreal Expos coaches
New York Mets players
Peninsula Whips players
St. John's Red Storm baseball players
St. Peter's Boys High School alumni
Baseball players from New York City
Syracuse Chiefs players
Tidewater Tides players